Pablo Cuevas is the defending champion, and despite returning to defend the title, he lost to Guido Pella in the semifinals.

Pella went on to win the title, defeating Íñigo Cervantes in the final 7–5, 2–6, 6–4

Seeds

Draw

Finals

Top half

Bottom half

References
 Main Draw
 Qualifying Draw

2015 ATP Challenger Tour
2015 Singles
2015 in Uruguayan tennis